"Sweet Surrender" is a song written by David Gates and performed by Bread. The single was the second release from their fifth album, Guitar Man, and was the last of four #1 hits for Bread on the US Easy Listening chart. "Sweet Surrender" spent two weeks at #1 on the chart, while on the Billboard Hot 100, it peaked at #15.

"Sweet Surrender" also did well internationally.  It was a Top 10 hit in Canada (#4) and New Zealand (#7).

Chart performance

Weekly charts

Year-end charts

See also
List of number-one adult contemporary singles of 1972 (U.S.)

References

External links
 

1972 songs
1972 singles
Bread (band) songs
Elektra Records singles
Songs written by David Gates